Rand Pecknold (born February 4, 1967) is an American ice hockey coach.

Career
He is currently the head coach of the Quinnipiac Bobcats men's ice hockey team. He took over the program at Quinnipiac in 1994 and led the transition from Division 2 to Division 1. Since moving to Division 1 in the 1998–1999 season he has led the Bobcats to 17 consecutive winning seasons the longest stretch after Michigan's streak of 25 years was broken in the 2012–13 season. In the 19th season behind the bench he led the Bobcats to the 2013 Frozen Four where they lost the National Championship to archrival Yale.  In the 2014–2015 season Coach Rand Pecknold reached 400 career wins, making him the 33rd D1 Head Coach to reach such a feat. Rand Pecknold once again led the Bobcats to the Frozen Four in 2015-16 where they fell in the National Championship to North Dakota 5-1.

Head coaching record

See also
List of college men's ice hockey coaches with 400 wins

References

External links

Rand Pecknold career record at College Hockey News

1967 births
Living people
American ice hockey coaches
Quinnipiac Bobcats men's ice hockey
Quinnipiac University people
Connecticut College alumni
People from Bedford, New Hampshire
Connecticut College Camels men's ice hockey players